Jacob Corman could refer to: 

Doyle Corman (Jacob Doyle Corman Jr.) (1932–2019), American politician
Jake Corman (Jacob Doyle Corman III) (born 1964), American politician, son of Doyle Corman